The Civic Union (Latvian: Pilsoniskā savienība, PS) was a political party in Latvia. It was founded in 2008, and most of its members came from the For Fatherland and Freedom/LNNK and New Era Party. A liberal-conservative party, it was part of the European People's Party at the European level. It has also been described as centre-right or right-wing.

The party was part of the coalition government led by Prime Minister of Latvia Valdis Dombrovskis. The Civic Union controlled the Latvia Ministry of Defence under the then-Minister Imants Viesturs Lieģis. A party leader was Sandra Kalniete, a former European Commissioner.

In the 2009 European Parliament election the Civic Union won over 24% of the vote in Latvia and gained two Members of the European Parliament.

On 6 August 2011, it merged with two other parties to form the new political party Unity.

References

External links
Official website

2008 establishments in Latvia
2011 disestablishments in Latvia
Conservative parties in Latvia
Defunct political parties in Latvia
Political parties disestablished in 2011
Political parties established in 2008